The 2014–15 season was the Al-Hilal Saudi Football Club's 58th in existence and 39th consecutive season in the top flight of Saudi Arabian football. Along with Pro League, the club participated in the AFC Champions League, Crown Prince Cup, and the King Cup.

Players

Squad information
Players and squad numbers.Note: Flags indicate national team as has been defined under FIFA eligibility rules. Players may hold more than one non-FIFA nationality.

Transfers

In

Out

Pre-season and friendlies

Competitions

Overall

Notes
Note 1: Al-Hilal qualified to the Quarter-finals.

Overview

Pro League

League table

Results summary

Results by round

Matches

Crown Prince Cup

Al-Hilal started the Crown Prince Cup directly in the round of 16, as one of last year's finalists.

King Cup

2014 AFC Champions League

Knockout stage

Quarter-finals

Semi-finals

Final

2015 AFC Champions League

Group stage

Knockout stage

Round of 16

Statistics

Goalscorers

Assists

References

Al Hilal SFC seasons
Hilal